William Shropshire (fl. 1388) of Bath, Somerset, was an English politician.

He was a Member (MP) of the Parliament of England for Bath in September 1388.

References

Year of birth missing
Year of death missing
English MPs September 1388
People from Bath, Somerset